Reed Lake is an intermittent, shallow endorheic salt lake in the south-western region of the Canadian province of Saskatchewan. Most of the lake and its shoreline is designated an Important Bird Area (IBA) of Canada and it is part of a Western Hemisphere Shorebird Reserve Network (WHSRN).

Description 
Being an endorheic lake, Reed Lake has no outflow. Inflow depends mainly on spring runoff and, as such, the lake is prone to significant fluctuations in water levels. The primary inflow is Lizard Creek which is located at the western end of Reed Lake. Rushlake Creek, which begins at Wood Mountain Hills, is a major tributary of Lizard Creek.

Morse, located at the north-eastern corner of Reed Lake, is the only community along its shores. The Trans-Canada Highway runs along the entire length of the northern shore.

IBA & WHSRN 
Reed Lake (SK 034) is an Important Bird Area (IBA) of Canada and it, along with neighbouring Chaplin and Old Wives Lakes, is part of a Western Hemisphere Shorebird Reserve Network (WHSRN). The WHSRN is one of only three such sites in Canada and the only one that is located inland. The other two sites are the Fraser River estuary and Bay of Fundy.

Birds commonly found at the lake include the piping plover, double-crested cormorant, American white pelican, northern shoveler, Canvasback, Franklin's gull, snow goose, tundra swan, stilt sandpiper, and the redhead.

See also 
List of lakes of Saskatchewan
Tourism in Saskatchewan
List of protected areas of Saskatchewan

References

External links 

Lakes of Saskatchewan
Important Bird Areas of Saskatchewan
Morse No. 165, Saskatchewan
Saline lakes of Canada
Endorheic lakes of Canada